Girls Behaving Badly is an American reality comedy television show that was on the Oxygen cable channel, and was also syndicated to television stations across the United States and Canada by Sony Pictures Television.

The show, described by the channel as "Sex and the City meets Candid Camera", presents a group of women playing pranks on unsuspecting victims.

Cast
 Chelsea Handler
 Melissa Howard
 Shondrella Avery
 Kira Soltanovich
 Candy Ford
 Victoria Schweizer
 Laura DeDona

Male cast
 Ken Jeong
 Nathan Van Dyke
 David Fisher
 Nick Rish

Home media
The show was released as volumes instead of seasons. Volume One was released on December 26, 2006. Volume Two was released on September 25, 2007.

External links
 
 Official Oxygen.com site for Girls Behaving Badly
 Official Sony site for Girls Behaving Badly

Oxygen (TV channel) original programming
Television series by Sony Pictures Television
2002 American television series debuts
2005 American television series endings
2000s American comedy television series
2000s American reality television series
American hidden camera television series